is a town located in Otokuni District, Kyoto Prefecture, Japan.

 the town has an estimated population of 16,226 and a density of 2,718 persons per km². The total area is 5.97 km².

The headquarters of Maxell and the Daihatsu Kyoto plant are located in Ōyamazaki.

History
 Battle of Yamazaki

Geography
 Mount Tennōzan
 Katsura River
 Uji River

Demographics
Per Japanese census data, the population of Ōyamazaki has remained relatively steady in recent decades.

Culture
 Asahi Beer Oyamazaki Villa Museum of Art

Transport
The town has two railway stations: Yamazaki Station on the JR Kyoto Line and Ōyamazaki Station on the Hankyu Kyoto Main Line.

For road traffic, Ōyamazaki Interchange of the Meishin Expressway, where the Keiji Bypass merges to the Meishin, is located in the town. National Highways Route 171 and Route 478 also provide access to the town.

References

External links

Ōyamazaki official website 

Towns in Kyoto Prefecture